Cheater is an EP by Randy, released in 2001.

Track listing
"Cheater"
"Don't Wanna Work"
"Stepping Out"
"Addicts Of Communication"
"Dynamite"
"I Won't Play That Song"

Information
 Songs 1-3 recorded at Midcan Studio, Winnipeg, Manitoba, Canada, by Randy
 Song 4-6 recorded at Studio Gröndahl, August 2000, by Pelle Gunnerfeldt
 Released on Tralla Records
 Performed by Randy

Randy (band) albums
2001 EPs
G7 Welcoming Committee Records albums